Raymond Claude Ferdinand Aron (14 March 1905 – 17 October 1983) was a French philosopher, sociologist, political scientist, historian and journalist, one of France's most prominent thinkers of the 20th century.

Aron is best known for his 1955 book The Opium of the Intellectuals, the title of which inverts Karl Marx's claim that religion was the opium of the people; he argues that Marxism was the opium of the intellectuals in post-war France. In the book, Aron chastised French intellectuals for what he described as their harsh criticism of capitalism and democracy and their simultaneous defense of Marxist oppression, atrocities and intolerance. Critic Roger Kimball suggests that Opium is "a seminal book of the twentieth century". Aron is also known for his lifelong friendship, sometimes fractious, with philosopher Jean-Paul Sartre. The saying "Better be wrong with Sartre than right with Aron." became popular among French intellectuals.

As a voice of moderation in politics, Aron had many disciples on both the political left and right; he remarked that he personally was "more of a left-wing Aronian than a right-wing one". He is generally referred to as a conservative liberal or right-wing liberal. Aron wrote extensively on a wide range of other topics. Citing the breadth and quality of Aron's writings, historian James R. Garland suggests, "Though he may be little known in America, Raymond Aron arguably stood as the preeminent example of French intellectualism for much of the twentieth century."

Life and career
Born in Paris, the son of a secular Jewish lawyer, Aron studied at the École Normale Supérieure, where he met Jean-Paul Sartre, who became his friend and later his lifelong intellectual opponent. He was a rational humanist, and a leader among those who did not embrace existentialism. Aron took first place in the agrégation of philosophy in 1928, the year Sartre failed the same exam. In 1930, he received a doctorate in the philosophy of history from the École Normale Supérieure.

He had been teaching social philosophy at the University of Toulouse for only a few weeks when World War II began; he joined the Armée de l'Air. When France was defeated, he left for London to join the Free French forces, editing the newspaper, France Libre (Free France).

When the war ended Aron returned to Paris to teach sociology at the École Nationale d'Administration and Sciences Po. From 1955 to 1968, he taught at the Sorbonne, and after 1970 at the Collège de France as well as the École des hautes études en sciences sociales (EHESS). In 1953, he befriended the young American philosopher Allan Bloom, who was teaching at the Sorbonne.

A lifelong journalist, Aron in 1947 became an influential columnist for Le Figaro, a position he held for thirty years until he joined L'Express, where he wrote a political column up to his death.

He was elected a Foreign Honorary Member of the American Academy of Arts and Sciences in 1960 and an International member of the American Philosophical Society in 1966.

In 1978 he founded Commentaire, a quarterly journal of ideas and debate, together with Jean-Claude Casanova who was the venture's founding director.

Aron died of a heart attack in Paris on 17 October 1983.

Political commitment
In Berlin, Aron witnessed the rise to power of the Nazi Party and developed an aversion to all totalitarian systems. In 1938, he participated in the Colloque Walter Lippmann in Paris. By the 1950s, he had grown very critical of the Austrian School and described their obsession with private property as an "inverted Marxism". Aron always promoted an "immoderately moderate" form of liberalism which accepted a mixed economy as the normal economic model of the age.

Political thought
Aron is the author of books on Karl Marx and on Carl von Clausewitz. In Peace and War, he set out a theory of international relations. He argues that Max Weber's claim that the state has a monopoly on the legitimate use of physical force does not apply to the relationship between states.

In the field of international relations in the 1950s, Aron hypothesized that despite the advent of nuclear weapons, nations would still require conventional military forces. The usefulness of such forces would be made necessary by what he called a "nuclear taboo."

Works
A prolific author, he "wrote several thousand editorials and several hundred academic articles, essays, and comments, as well as about forty books", which include:
 La Sociologie allemande contemporaine, Paris: Alcan, 1935; German Sociology, London: Heinemann, 1957
 Introduction à la philosophie de l'histoire. Essai sur les limites de l'objectivité historique, Paris: Gallimard, 1938; Introduction to the Philosophy of History: An Essay on the Limits of Historical Objectivity, London: Weidenfeld & Nicolson, 1948
 Essai sur la théorie de l'histoire dans l'Allemagne contemporaine. La philosophie critique de l'histoire, Paris: Vrin, 1938
 L'Homme contre les tyrans, New York, Editions de la Maison française, 1944
 De l'armistice à l'insurrection nationale, Paris: Gallimard, 1945
 L'Âge des empires et l'Avenir de la France, Paris: Défense de la France, 1945
 Le Grand Schisme, Paris: Gallimard, 1948
 Les Guerres en Chaîne, Paris: Gallimard, 1951; The Century of Total War, London: Derek Verschayle, 1954
 La Coexistence pacifique. Essai d'analyse, Paris: Editions Monde nouveau, 1953 (under the pseudonym François Houtisse, with Boris Souvarine)
 L'Opium des intellectuels, Paris: Calmann-Lévy, 1955; The Opium of the Intellectuals, London: Secker & Warburg, 1957
 Polémiques, Paris: Gallimard, 1955
 La Tragédie algérienne, Paris: Plon, 1957
 Espoir et peur du siècle. Essais non partisans, Paris: Calmann-Lévy, 1957 (partially translated in, On War: atomic weapons & global diplomacy, London, Secker & Warburg, 1958)
 L'Algérie et la République, Paris: Plon, 1958
 La Société industrielle et la Guerre, suivi d'un Tableau de la diplomatie mondiale en 1958, Paris: Plon, 1959
 Immuable et changeante. De la IVe à la Ve République, Paris: Calmann-Lévy, 1959 ; France, Steadfast and Changing: The Fourth to the Fifth Republic, Cambridge (Mass.): Harvard University Press, 1960.
 Introduction. Classes et conflits de classes dans la société industrielle (Ralph Dahrendorf), Paris: Mouton Éditeur, 1959
 Dimensions de la conscience historique, Paris: Plon, 1961
 Paix et guerre entre les nations, Paris: Calmann-Lévy, 1962; Peace and War, London: Weidenfeld & Nicolson, 1966
 Le Grand Débat. Initiation à la stratégie atomique, Paris: Calmann-Lévy, 1963, The Great Debate, New York, Doubleday & Company, Inc., 1965
 Dix-huit leçons sur la société industrielle, Paris: Gallimard, 1963; Eighteen Lectures on Industrial Society, London: Weidenfeld & Nicolson, 1967
 La Lutte des classes, Paris: Gallimard, 1964
 Essai sur les libertés, Paris: Calmann-Lévy, 1965
 Démocratie et totalitarisme, Paris: Gallimard, 1965; Democracy and totalitarianism, Weidenfeld and Nicolson, 1968
 Trois essais sur l'âge industriel, Paris: Plon, 1966; The Industrial Society. Three Essays on Ideology and Development, London: Weidenfeld & Nicolson, 1967
 Les Étapes de la pensée sociologique, Paris: Gallimard, 1967; Main Currents in Sociological Thought, London: Weidenfeld & Nicolson, 1965
 De Gaulle, Israël et les Juifs, Paris: Plon,  1968; De Gaulle, Israel and the Jews, Praeger, 1969
 La Révolution introuvable. Réflexions sur les événements de mai, Paris: Fayard, 1968
 Les Désillusions du progrès, Paris: Calmann-Lévy, 1969; Progress and Disillusion: The Dialectics of Modern Society, Pall Mall Press, 1968
 D'une sainte famille à l'autre. Essai sur le marxisme imaginaire, Paris: Gallimard, 1969
 De la condition historique du sociologue, Paris: Gallimard, 1971
 Études politiques, Paris: Gallimard, 1972
 République impériale. Les États-unis dans le monde (1945–1972), Paris: Calmann-Lévy, 1973; The Imperial Republic: The United States and the World 1945–1973, Little Brown & Company 1974
 Histoire et dialectique de la violence, Paris: Gallimard, 1973; History and the Dialectic of Violence: Analysis of Sartre's Critique de la raison dialectique, Oxford: Blackwell, 1979
 Penser la guerre, Clausewitz, Paris: Gallimard, 1976; Clausewitz: Philosopher of War, London: Routledge, 1983
 Plaidoyer pour l'Europe décadente, Paris: Laffont, 1977; In Defense of Decadent Europe, South Bend IN: Regnery, 1977
 with Andre Glucksman and Benny Levy. "Sartre's Errors: A Discussion". Telos 44 (Summer 1980). New York: Telos Press
 Le Spectateur engagé, Paris: Julliard, 1981 (interviews)
 Mémoires, Paris: Julliard, 1983
 Les dernières années du siècle, Paris: Julliard, 1984
 Ueber Deutschland und den Nationalsozialismus. Fruehe politische Schriften 1930–1939,  Joachim Stark, ed. and pref., Opladen: Leske & Budrich, 1993
 Le Marxisme de Marx, Paris: Éditions de Fallois, 2002
 De Giscard à Mitterrand: 1977–1983 (editorials from L'Express), with preface by Jean-Claude Casanova, Paris: Éditions de Fallois, 2005

Other media
 Raymond Aron, spectateur engagé. Entretiens avec Raymond Aron. (Duration: 160 mins.), DVD, Éditions Montparnasse, 2005

References

Sources
 Anderson, Brian C., Raymond Aron: The Recovery of the Political, Rowman & Littlefield, 1998
 Craiutu, Aurelian, "Raymond Aron and the tradition of political moderation in France", French Liberalism from Montesquieu to the Present Day, Cambridge University Press, 2012.
 Davis, Reed M. A Politics of Understanding: The International Thought of Raymond Aron. Baton Rouge LA.:Louisiana State University Press, 2009 
 Gagliano, Giuseppe La nuova sinistra americana e il movimento del maggio francese nelle interpretazioni di Raymon Aron e Herbert Marcuse. Uniservice, 2011 
 Launay, Stephen, La Pensée politique de Raymond Aron, Paris: Presses Universitaires de France, 1995
 Mahoney, Daniel and Bryan-Paul Frost (eds.), Political Reason in the Age of Ideology: Essays in Honor of Raymond Aron, New Brunswick/London: Transaction Publishers, 2006
 Molina, Jerónimo, Raymond Aron, realista político. Del maquiavelismo a la crítica de las religiones seculares, Madrid: Sequitur, 2013
 Stark, Joachim, Das unvollendete Abenteuer. Geschichte, Gesellschaft und Politik im Werk Raymond Arons, Wuerzburg: Koenigshausen und Neumann, 1986
 Stark, Joachim, Raymond Aron (1905–1983), in Dirk Kaesler, Klassiker der Soziologie, Vol. II: Von Talcott Parsons bis Anthony Giddens, Munich: Beck, 5th ed., 2007, 105–129
 Bavaj, Riccardo, Ideologierausch und Realitaetsblindheit. Raymond Arons Kritik am Intellektuellen franzoesischen Typs, Zeithistorische Forschungen/Studies in Contemporary History 5 (2008), No. 2, 332–338,
 Oppermann, Matthias, Raymond Aron und Deutschland. Die Verteidigung der Freiheit und das Problem des Totalitarismus, Ostfildern: Thorbecke Verlag 2008.
 Oppermann, Matthias (Ed.), Im Kampf gegen die modernen Tyranneien. Ein Raymond-Aron-Brevier, Zurich: NZZ Libro 2011.
 Stark, Joachim, "Das unvollendete Abenteuer. Geschichte, Gesellschaft und Politik im Werk Raymond Arons", Wuerzburg: Koenigshausen und Neumann, 1986
 Stark, Joachim, "Raymond Aron (1905–1983)", in Dirk Kaesler, Klassiker der Soziologie, Vol. II: Von Talcott Parsons bis Anthony Giddens, Munich: Beck, 5th ed., 2007, 105–129
 Stewart, Iain, Raymond Aron and Liberal Thought in the Twentieth Century'' (Cambridge University Press, 2019)

1905 births
1983 deaths
20th-century French non-fiction writers
20th-century French philosophers
Aphorists
Burials at Montparnasse Cemetery
Academic staff of the Collège de France
Continental philosophers
Critical theorists
Critics of Marxism
Critics of religions
École Normale Supérieure alumni
Epistemologists
Fellows of the American Academy of Arts and Sciences
French agnostics
French anti-communists
French anti-fascists
French columnists
French ethicists
French humanists
20th-century French Jews
French conservative liberals
French male non-fiction writers
French male writers
French military personnel of World War II
French political philosophers
French political scientists
French Section of the Workers' International politicians
French sociologists
Hudson Institute
Lycée Condorcet alumni
Lycée Hoche alumni
Liberalism in France
Members of the Royal Academy of Belgium
Metaphysicians
Ontologists
Philosophers of culture
Philosophers of history
Philosophers of war
Political philosophers
Rally of the French People politicians
Rationalists
Recipients of the Pour le Mérite (civil class)
Scholars of Marxism
Sciences Po alumni
French social commentators
Social philosophers
Theorists on Western civilization
Academic staff of the University of Toulouse
Writers from Paris
Corresponding Fellows of the British Academy
Le Figaro people
Members of the American Philosophical Society
Member of the Mont Pelerin Society